The Tam Dao salamander or Vietnamese salamander (Paramesotriton deloustali) is a species of salamander in the family Salamandridae found only in Vietnam. Its natural habitats are subtropical or tropical moist lowland forests, subtropical or tropical moist montane forests, and rivers. It is threatened by habitat loss and poaching.

References

Paramesotriton
Salamander, Tam Dao
Endemic fauna of Vietnam
Least concern biota of Asia
Taxonomy articles created by Polbot
Amphibians described in 1934
Taxa named by René Léon Bourret